"I Never Once Stopped Loving You" is a single by American country music artist Connie Smith.  Released in March 1970, the song reached #5 on the Billboard Hot Country Singles chart. An album of the same name was released in September 1970 that included the song. In addition, "I Never Once Stopped Loving You" also peaked at #17 on the Canadian RPM   Country Tracks chart. Tammy Wynette recorded the song for her eighth studio album The First Lady released in 1970.

Chart performance

References

1970 singles
Connie Smith songs
Songs written by Bill Anderson (singer)
Song recordings produced by Bob Ferguson (musician)
Songs written by Jan Howard
1970 songs
RCA Victor singles